“The Duel” is a work of short fiction by Joseph Conrad, first published in the Pall Mall Magazine in January–May, 1908. The story was collected in A Set of Six (1908) released by Methuen Publishing.

Plot

“Duel” is told from a third-person omniscient point of view. The story is set during the Napoleonic Wars (1803-1815), a period of mass military mobilization across Europe.

The focal characters are two French cavalry officers—Hussars—serving in Napoleon’s army. Though dueling is frowned upon by the military establishment, it is not forbidden. Only officers of the same rank may engage in these contests to resolve matters of personal honor.

The story opens in Strasbourg during a brief lull in the military campaigns. Lieutenant D’Hubert is an officier d’ordonnance for the division. Tall and blond, his temperament is proud, yet mild and phlegmatic. Of Picardian heritage, he ranks among the gentry: his future in the military is promising. Lieutenant Feraud is short, well-built Gascon with black curly hair. His temperament is fiery and impulsive. Unlike D’Hubert, he does not possess family connections. Both men are admired within their own circle of friends. Skilled at arms and possessing great physical courage, they are each dedicated to serving Napoleon.

In Strasbourg, Lieut. Feraud and a gentleman from one the town’s first families, quarrel in a local tavern. A duel is quickly arranged, and the gentleman is severely wounded by Feraud. The commander of the garrison orders D’Hubert to find Feraud and place him under house arrest until the matter can be resolved with the influential family.

D'Hubert finds Feraud at Madame de Lionne’s elite salon. Feraud is appalled and infuriated at d’Hubert’s officious intrusion.  When he discovers he is being placed under house arrest, d’Hubert becomes the object of his outrage. Despite d'Hubert’s efforts to calm his fellow officer, Feraud draws his sword in earnest. A desperate sword fight ensues. Ferard suffers a minor wound, but the combat solves nothing.

During the next sixteen years—during the bloody campaigns of the Napoleonic War—the two officers, each enjoying promotions to senior officers, engage in a succession of duels. These combats are always initiated by Feraud, whose desire to kill d’Hubert develops into an obsession. D’Hubert, in turn, defends himself as a simple matter of honor. 
The conflict between the officers becomes almost legendary. Their contemporaries attach a significance to the origins of the dispute that endows it with a gravity it does not possess. The perpetual and life-threatening conflict sustained by Feraud and d’Hubert takes on almost mythical proportions.

In the post-war era the adversaries enter their middle age. Feraud, still in pursuit, confronts d’Hubert at his country estate and demands satisfaction to be settled with dueling pistols. D’Hubert outwits his adversary, enabling him to spare Feraud’s life. As a condition he extracts a promise from his nemesis that they never fight again.

Background

Conrad’s “fascination” with the Napoleonic Wars (1799-1815) was informed in his youth by a Polish uncle who had participated in Napoleon’s Russia Campaign in 1812. Literary critic Jocelyn Baines writes:

The scenario for “The Duel” had its origins in an 1858 account published in Harper’s Magazine, which Conrad may have enlisted as the basis for his story.

Critical Assessment

Literary critic Jocelyn Baines praises “The Duel” as a “delightful tale of how one of Napoleon’s officers, Feraud, a fiery little Gascon, compels another, a cautious and gentle[Picardian named d’Hubert, to fight a succession of duels with him because he images himself insulted.” Baines continues: “It is an excellently told tale, gently humorous and ironical, but touches no very deep emotion, and Conrad was claiming rather a lot to describe it as an attempt  to ‘capture…the Spirit of the Epoch.’”

Literary critic Laurence Graver includes “The Duel” among Conrad’s “most optimistic and least demanding works…” Indeed, Conrad, in a letter to his agent J. B. Pinker wrote: “...my modesty prevents me from saying that I think the story is good. Action sensational. The happy ending.”

Theme

Critic Graver identifies the theme as a conflict between “egoism and altruism” reflected in the characters of Feraud and d’Hubert, respectively. The focal character of the tale, officer d’Hubert, develops an ambivalence for officer Feraud, combining an “irreconcilable antagonism” with an “irrational affection.” Graver writes:

The essentially petty feud between the two officers is offered as a tableau for  the monumental upheavals of early 19th Century Europe.

Critic Baines notes the parallel that Conrad attempts to draw between a minor personal dispute concerning honor and self-esteem and the European social catastrophe of the early 19th Century:

Footnotes

Sources 
Baines, Jocelyn. 1960. Joseph Conrad: A Critical Biography, McGraw-Hill Book Company, New York. 
Graver, Laurence. 1969. Conrad’s Short Fiction. University of California Press, Berkeley, California. 

Short stories by Joseph Conrad
1908 short stories